Brenda Wootton (née Ellery) (10 February 1928 – 11 March 1994) was a British folk singer and poet and was seen as an ambassador for Cornish tradition and culture in all the Celtic nations and as far as Australia and Canada.

Early life and career
Brenda Ellery was born in London, during a brief few months when her Cornish-born parents were there looking for work, but was back home in Cornwall at 6 months old. She grew up in the fishing village of Newlyn. In 1948 she married John Wootton, a radio engineer from Wolverhampton, and their daughter Susan was born in 1949. They lived in Sennen, then Penzance, with Brenda running a bed and breakfast business and very involved in amateur dramatics. In 1964 she switched careers and helped her brother Peter Ellery set up his Tremaen Pottery business - becoming a director and running the family shop in Penzance, Tremaen Craft Market.

She first found her voice as a young schoolgirl, singing in chapel choirs and village halls in the remote communities of West Cornwall. Brenda became active on the Cornish music scene in the early 1960s, taking over the recently formed Count House Folk Music Club at Botallack near St Just in 1967, to found her own Pipers Folk Club, at St Buryan, Cornwall. She was later able to move Pipers back to the Count House, and subsequently into Penzance at the Western Hotel. In 1973 she was introduced to Richard Gendall, who taught her two songs in Cornish to sing at that year's Pan Celtic Festival in Killarney in Ireland, and she welcomed the opportunity to sing in Cornwall's own language, Kernewek, pledging to sing at least one song in Cornish at every concert. Richard wrote over 460 songs for Brenda, over 140 of them in the Cornish language. In 1974, Brenda handed Tremaen Craft Market over to daughter Sue to manage, and turned professional as a singer.

Her early albums were recorded on Cornwall's Sentinel label, often with John the Fish (John Langford), with whom she sang for six years. Brenda later sang with Robert Bartlett and with guitarists Pete Berryman, Mike Silver, Al Fenn, David Penhale and Chris Newman.

Her repertoire over the years covered folk, rock, blues, jazz and even hymns, but she is best remembered for her Cornish "standards" such as Lamorna, The White Rose, Camborne Hill, The Stratton Carol and the ballads Mordonnow, Tamar, Silver Net and Lyonesse, those last all written by Richard Gendall. 

She was equally at home when singing in Cornish, Breton or English and was as famous in Brittany, which she visited regularly, as she was in her native Cornwall. She appeared in the first ever Lorient Interceltic Festival in Brittany in the early 1970s.  Brenda became famous throughout the world where she was welcomed by Cornish exiles and others, and sang at the Kernewek Lowender in South Australia three times, and in Canada as well as all over Europe. She reached number 1 in the pop charts in Japan with the maxi single 'Walk Across the World'.

Brenda was made a bard of the Gorsedh Kernow in 1977, and took as her bardic name Gwylan Gwavas (Seagull of Newlyn). In her later years, she became well known in Cornwall as a presenter for BBC Radio Cornwall where she hosted the popular weekly request show Sunday Best, until 1990. She was also the Honorary President of Radio Beacon, the hospital radio service for St Lawrences Hospital in Bodmin. She died in Penzance aged 66, in March 1994 after a long illness.

Rediscovered Bobino tapes

In 2010 Wootton's recording engineer John Knight rediscovered the analogue master tapes of a live performance from June 1984, at the peak of her international career. The concert, which took place at the Bobino music hall theatre in Paris, featured Wootton with the Camborne Town Band, and musicians Ray Roberts, Dave Freeman and Chris Newman. The recording was subsequently digitally mastered and released as All of Me, featuring nineteen tracks and a sixteen-page booklet of unpublished photographs, many from Wootton's own private collection.

Legacy
In 2017, BBC Radio Cornwall awarded Brenda a Blue Plaque as Cornwall's best loved 'music legend', voted on by their listeners. In 2021, the Blue Plaque will be erected on the walls of the Count House at Botallack near St Just, the site of her Pipers Folk Club, and from where her music career began. Following on from her publication of Brenda's poems, 'Pantomime Stew', in 1995, Brenda's daughter Sue Ellery-Hill has privately produced three new CDs with recordings of Brenda old and new, many songs previously unheard. In 2018 she published her mother's biography 'Brenda: For the Love of Cornwall - the Life and Times of Brenda Wootton, Cornwall's First Lady of Song', and in 2021 has brought out a new Songbook with two CDs of Brenda singing in Kernewek, the Cornish language, all written for Brenda by Richard Gendall. A new project is now underway to produce a film, exhibition and archive of Brenda's life and music, being run by Bosena in Penzance. The exhibition will run in October 2021.

Recordings

Singles and EPs
 "Apple Wine / Silver Net", Transatlantic, 1979
 "Berceuses Celtiques Iles Britanniques" (EP), (with pop-up cover), Le Chant du Monde: 100406, CM 650, 1981
 "Hark the Glad Sound", RCA Victor: PB 61264, 1983
 "Dus Tre" / "Paris - What's In A Name?" (Promo), RCA:	DB 61311, 1984		
 "Tamar" / "Waiting for the Tide" / "Towl Ros" / "Kenavo Dewgenoughwhy" (French promo), Disc'Az: 1061, 1986
 "Everybody Knows" Maxi Single 45rpm, Edition23 France, EDM039

Albums
Piper's Folk, with John the Fish & Piper's Folk, (Private pressing, produced & distributed by Piper's Folk), 1968
Pasties & Cream, with John the Fish, Sentinel Records, SENS 1006, 1971
Way Down to Lamorna, Sentinel, SENS 1056, 1972
Crowdy Crawn, with Richard Gendall, Sentinel, SENS 1016, 1973
Pamplemousse, with Robert Bartlett, Barclay (French label), 1973
No Song To Sing, with Robert Bartlett and "guest" Alex Atterson on piano, Sentinel, SENS 1021, 1974
Tin in the Stream, with Robert Bartlett, Stockfisch (German label), 1974 (voted West Germany's folk album of the year)
Starry Gazey Pie, with Robert Bartlett, Sentinel, SENS 1031, 1975
Children Singing, with Richard Gendall, Sentinel, SENS 1036, 1976
Carillon, Transatlantic Records, TRA 360, 1979
Boy Jan ... Cornishman, with David Penhale (voice, guitar and bouzouki) and Richard Gendall (composer), Burlington Records, BURL 005, 1980
La Grande Cornouaillaise, Burlington Records, BURL 007, 1980
Gwavas Lake, with The Four Lanes Male Choir, Burlington Records, BURL 008, 1980
Lyonesse, with David King (acoustic guitar), RCA, PL 70299, 1982
My Land, RCA, PL 70234, 1983
B Comme Brenda, Disc'Az (French label), AZ 494, 1985
Tamar, Disc'Az, AZ 505, 1986
The Voice of Cornwall, Keltia Musique KMCD67, 1996
All of Me, with Brenda's Trio and Camborne Town Band Label- Knight Design, Cat. No. KDBWAOM00001 Dec. 2010.
Brenda At Buryan: Live At Pipers Folk Club St. Buryan 1967 with John the Fish (2013 CD)
Brenda at Christmas (2017 CD)
Brenda Sings Ballads (2019 CD)
Brenda Yn Kernewek: Brenda sings over 30 of Richard Gendall's songs in Cornish (2021 Songbook + 2 CDs)

Publications
Pantomime Stew – An Anthology of Poetry, Doggerel and Nonsense by Brenda Wootton (Book, 1995, Publ. privately)
Brenda: For the Love of Cornwall - The Life & Times of Brenda Wootton, Cornwall's First Lady of Song (Biography Book, 2018 TJINK Publ.)
Brenda Yn Kernewek: Brenda sings over 30 of Richard Gendall's songs in Cornish (2021 Songbook + 2 CDs)

See also

References

External links
 Official Brenda Wootton website
 
 Brenda Wootton Paris concert unearthed at bbc.co.uk
 Cornwall Heritage Trust: Blue Plaque for Brenda
 Cornwall National Music Archive
 Bosena's Brenda Wootton page: Mordonnow
 

1928 births
1994 deaths
Bards of Gorsedh Kernow
Cornish-speaking people
People from Newlyn
Cornish folk singers
English people of Cornish descent
20th-century English singers
Transatlantic Records artists
20th-century English women singers
20th-century English musicians